Parapheromia ficta is a species of geometrid moth in the family Geometridae. It is found in North America.

The MONA or Hodges number for Parapheromia ficta is 6610.

References

Further reading

 

Boarmiini
Articles created by Qbugbot
Moths described in 1972